Steve Tuynman (born 30 May 1963, in Sydney, New South Wales), is a former Australian rugby union player.  He played in 34 tests for the Wallabies between 1983 and 1990.

References

Living people
1963 births
Rugby union players from Sydney
Australia international rugby union players
Rugby union number eights